Intense tropical cyclones usually produce tornadoes, the majority of those weak, especially upon landfall.

List of tornadoes 
These are the tropical cyclones that are known to have spawned tornadoes. The list is most complete for the U.S., but does include other areas. Within the United States 1,163 tornadoes were associated with tropical cyclones, accounting for slightly under 6% of all tornadoes. The most tornadoes spawned by a single tropical cyclone were associated with Hurricane Ivan, which spawned 120 tornadoes.

Pre–1900

1900–1949

1950–1979

1980–1999

2000–2009

2010–2019

2020–2022

See also
 List of tropical cyclones
 List of Atlantic hurricanes
 List of tornadoes and tornado outbreaks
 List of F5 and EF5 tornadoes
 List of F4 and EF4 tornadoes
 List of F4 and EF4 tornadoes (2010–2019)
 List of F4 and EF4 tornadoes (2020–present)

References

Further reading

External links 
 The Tornado Project
 Hurricanes vs. Tornadoes (AOML)
 Tropical Cyclone Tornado Research Group at Saint Louis University

Tornadoes
Tornadoes
Tornadoes
Tornado-related lists